Gonzalo Pereira Cejudo (born 14 February 1997), sometimes known simply as Gonzalo, is a Spanish footballer who plays for SCR Peña Deportiva as a central defender.

Club career
Born in Barcelona, Catalonia, Pereira finished his formation with CF Damm. On 15 July 2016, he joined CE Sabadell FC and was assigned to the reserves in Tercera División.

In August 2017, Pereira moved to another reserve team, CF Reus Deportiu B also in the fourth level. He made his first-team debut on 19 August, coming on as a first-half substitute for injured Mikel Villanueva in a 0–2 away loss against UD Las Palmas.

Pereira was regularly utilized in the first team during the first half of the 2018–19 season, but the side was expelled by the LFP in January. On 20 February 2019, he was presented at CD Calahorra in Segunda División B.

On 18 March 2019, Pereira agreed to a pre-contract deal with Levante UD, effective as of 1 July; he was initially assigned to the B-team also in the third division. He made his first team – and La Liga – debut on 7 December, playing the last 13 minutes in a 2–4 home loss against Valencia CF.

References

External links

1997 births
Living people
Footballers from Barcelona
Spanish footballers
Association football defenders
La Liga players
Segunda División players
Segunda División B players
Tercera División players
CF Damm players
CE Sabadell FC B players
CF Reus Deportiu B players
CF Reus Deportiu players
CD Calahorra players
Atlético Levante UD players
Levante UD footballers
SCR Peña Deportiva players
Águilas FC players
UE Olot players